Old Mortlake Burial Ground, also known as Old Mortlake Cemetery, is a cemetery in Mortlake in the London Borough of Richmond upon Thames, at Avenue Gardens, London SW14 8BP. Established in 1854, and enlarged in 1877, it is now managed by Richmond upon Thames Borough Council.

The cemetery contains Commonwealth war graves of 21 British service personnel, 19 from World War I and two from World War II.

Notable burials
Notable people buried in Old Mortlake Burial Ground include:
 Sir Arthur Bliss (1891–1975), composer and conductor
 Sir Edwin Chadwick (1800–1890), social reformer
 Henry Clutton (1819–1893), architect and designer
 Rear Admiral Lord William FitzRoy (1782–1857), Royal Navy officer and Member of Parliament. His grave is marked by an obelisk
 Charles Dickens, Jr. (1837–1896), writer, editor, and eldest son of the famous novelist
 Georgina Hogarth (1827–1917), sister-in-law, housekeeper, and adviser of novelist Charles Dickens and the editor of two volumes of his collected letters after his death
 Admiral Sir Erasmus Ommanney KCB, FRS, FRGS, JP (1814–1904), Royal Navy officer and Arctic explorer
 Thomas German Reed (1817–1888), theatrical manager, composer, musical director, actor and singer who, with his wife Priscilla Horton (1818–1895), created the German Reed Entertainments, family-friendly musical plays "of a refined nature"

See also
 Mortlake Cemetery

References

External links
 Official website
 

1854 establishments in England
Cemeteries in the London Borough of Richmond upon Thames
Commonwealth War Graves Commission cemeteries in England
Charles Dickens
Mortlake, London
Former cemeteries